Maharaj Kumar Priya Brata was an Indian politician and official. He served as Chief Minister of Manipur from 15 August 1947 to 15 October 1949.

Early life 
He was the second son of Churachand Maharaj and Rani Shyamasakhi on 17 February 1911.  

He was the fourth child and second son of Maharaja Churachand Singh. He was educated at the Rajkumar College, Raipur (Chhattisgarh). He passed the examination from Ewing Christian College, Allahabad and graduated from the Allahabad University in 1934.

Career 
He was appointed Durbar Member in 1936 and given the portfolio of Education, Police and P.W.D. Besides, he supervised Manipur State Arts and Crafts. 

He was commissioned as an Emergency Commissioned Officer in August, 1942. He served with the 2nd Assam Regiment. Released early 1947, he rejoined the State Durbar and was in Charge of police. 

He was involved in the Bharat Sevak. He became a member and President of the Manipur Cultural Conference, a socio-cultural organisation, which attempted to increase understanding between the State's various ethnic groups. He visited all the villages in the hills. 

He was involved with the Manipur Spinning Mills Corporation at its initial stage. 

He introduced exotic plants into the state, including  sandalwood, Araucaria, Pinus longfolia, kendu, yew, Spathodea, Eucalyptus, and Sal Deodarun. He worked to establish Dhanamanjuri College and Shyamasakhi Girls High School. 

After the introduction of the Manipur State Constitution Act 1947 he became a Cabinet Minister. After 14 August 1947 when Major F.F. Pearson I.P.S. left with the coming of Independence to India, he took over as Chief Minister. He headed the Interim Council from 14 August 1947 to 7 October 1948. After the election for the Manipur State Assembly, he was nominated as Chief Minister with the concurrence of the Majority party, the Praja Shanti. He held the post of Dewan until it was taken over by Major Rawal Amar Singh on 18 April 1949 with the Merger of the State to the Union of India.

After politics, he devoted his life to social activities and painting. He was a pioneer in contemporary painting in Manipur. His contribution to the Imphal Arts College was notable.

Recognition 

 Manipur University honoured him with D.Litt (Honours Causa).
 The Cultural Forum awarded him the Thoibi award in 1991
 Manipuri Sahitya Parishad gave him the Srimad Paramhans Swami Yogendra Giri Memorial in 2000.

References 

Meitei royalty
1911 births
2005 deaths